According to the 2011 census, West Bengal has over 24.6 million Muslims, making up 27% of the state's population. The vast majority of Muslims in West Bengal are ethnic native Bengali Muslims, numbering around over 22 million and comprising 24.1% of the state population (mostly they reside in Rural areas). There also exists an Immigrants Urdu-speaking Muslim community numbering 2.6 million, constituting 2.9% of the state population and mostly resides in Urban areas of the state.

Muslims form the majority of the population in three districts: Murshidabad, Malda and Uttar Dinajpur. Among these, Uttar Dinajpur is notable as ethnic Bengali Muslims comprise 48% of the district's population, with the remaining 2% being Urdu and Surjapuri speakers.

Demography

History

Islam first arrived in Bengal in the year 1204. The establishment of the first Muslim state in Bengal, the Bengal Sultanate, in 1352 by Shamsuddin Ilyas Shah is credited to giving rise to a Bengali socio-linguistic identity. The Sultanate's influence was expansive, with the Hindu-born sultan Jalaluddin Muhammad Shah funding the construction of Islamic institutions as far as Mecca and Medina, which came to be known as al-Madaris al-Banjaliyyah (Bengali madrasas). Sufis also became prominent in this period, such as Usman Serajuddin, also known as Akhi Siraj Bengali, who was a native of Gaur in western Bengal and became the Sultanate's court scholar during Ilyas Shah's reign. Alongside Persian and Arabic, the Sultanate also used the Bengali language to gain patronage and support, contrary to previous states which exclusively favored liturgical languages such as Sanskrit and Pali. Islam became especially widespread when the region was under Mughal rule from 1576 to 1765 and was commonly known as Bengal Subah. The Mughal Emperors considered Bengal their most prized province. The Mughal emperor Akbar is credited with developing the modern Bengali calendar.

Population

Partition and immigration

The Muslim population in West Bengal before 1947 partition was around 30%. After partition of Bengal in 1947, some Muslims from West Bengal left for East Pakistan, (Present-Day-Bangladesh). Estimates show that 1,534,718 Muslim refugees from West Bengal settling permanently in East Pakistan during 1947–1951.

Population by district (2011)

Linguistic groups 
According to the 2021 census estimation, there were around 30 million Muslims living in West Bengal, constituting 28.9% respectively. Nearly most of them (26% of state population), about 27 million are native Bengali Muslims, constituting around 90% of the total Muslim population in the state, and are mostly concentrated in rural and Semi Urban areas. The Urdu-speaking Muslims from Bihar and Uttar Pradesh constitute rest 2.9%, numbering around 3 million and are mainly concentrated in Kolkata, Asansol, Islampur subdivision of West Bengal.

Notable Muslims from West Bengal

Kolkata

 Begum Rokeya, Bengali feminist thinker, writer, Philanthropist
 Altamas Kabir, Indian former Chief Justice of India
Abdul Masood, Indian Former cricketer. 
 Hashim Abdul Halim, Indian Speaker of the West Bengal Legislative Assembl. 
 Mohammed Ali Qamar, boxer, medalist in Commonwealth Games.
 Rupam Islam, Indian musician
 Mohammad Hamid Ansari, former Vice President of India
 Mohammed Salim (footballer), Indian footballer
 Mohammed Salim (politician), The Minister for Technical Education and Training, Youth Welfare 
 Firhad Hakim, Mayor of Kolkata, MIC Urban Development and Municipal Affairs
 Sultan Ahmed (politician), Indian politician and former Union Minister of State Tourism. 
 Noor Alam Chowdhury, Former Minister of Animal Resources Development.
 Mohammed Rafique (footballer), Indian footballer 
 Sahil Khan, Indian gymnast and model of India
 Nafisa Ali, Indian actress, politician and social activist 
 Pinky Lilani, Indian author, motivational speaker, food expert and women's advocate

Malda
 Alaul Haq, Bengali Islamic scholar
 Usman Serajuddin, Bengali Islamic scholar
 A B A Ghani Khan Choudhury, former Railways Minister (India)
 Mausam Noor former M.P of Maldaha Uttar
 Abu Hasem Khan Choudhury M.P of Maldaha Dakshin and Ex-State Health Minister
 Isha Khan Choudhury current M.L.A of Sujapur (Vidhan Sabha constituency)
 Abu Nasar Khan Choudhury Ex-M.L.A of Sujapur (Vidhan Sabha constituency) and Ex-Minister of Science and Technology
 Sabina Yeasmin current M.L.A of Mothabari and Minister of North Bengal Development, Irrigation Department
 Rubi Noor former three times M.L.A of Sujapur (Vidhan Sabha constituency)

Murshidabad
Murshid Quli Khan, the first Nawab of Bengal
Amina Begum, princess of the Nawab family and mother of siraj ud-Daulah
Siraj ud-Daulah, last independent nawab of Bengal
Abul Hayat, actor
Mir Afsar Ali, radio jockey, actor
Abdul Alim, folk singer, songwriter
Baby Islam, cinematographer and director
Syed Mustafa Siraj, Bengali writer
Mujibar Rahaman, Bengali Documentary Filmmaker
Moinul Hassan, writer, member of Parliament of India
Mabinul Haq, Bengali writer
Moniruddin Khan, Bengali poet and writer
Abul Bashar, Bengali writer
Syed Badrudduja, politician and former mayor of Kolkata
Jahanara Imam, writer and political activist
Zainal Abedin, politician and four time former MP of Jangipur
Niamot Sheikh, M.L.A of Hariharpara, Hariharpara
Babar Ali (teacher), "youngest headmaster in the world" by BBC

Hooghly
 Muhammad Mohsin, Bengali social reformer, Islamic scholar, Philanthropists, Daanvir. 
Abdul Mannan (West Bengal politician), politician
Abbas Siddiqui, Founder of Indian Secular Front.

Bardhaman
 Kazi Nazrul Islam, Bengali poet and music lyricist composer, writer known as Bidrohi Kobi. 
Abul Hashim, Islamic thinker and Freedom Fighter. 
Abdullah el Baqui, Bengali Islamic scholar, writer, Freedom Fighter. 
Nawab Abdul Jabbar, Indian bureaucrat, Social worker. 
Sheikh Saidul Haque, The first and incumbent M.P. from Bardhaman-Durgapur constituency. 
Abu Ayesh Mondal, Former chairman of West Bengal Minority Development & Finance Corporation. 
 Siddiqullah Chowdhury, politician, minister and president Of Jamiat Ulema-e-Hind.

Birbhum
Ekram Ali, Bengali poet

North 24 Parganas
 Azizul Haque (educator), Educationist, Education minister for Bengal . 
 Mohammad Akram Khan, Bengali journalist,
 Masudur Rahman Baidya, Bengali swimmer.
 Sheikh Sahil , Footballer
 Rafikul Islam Mondal  Indian politician ,MLA from the Basirhat Uttar.
 Haji Nurul Islam Indian politician ,MLA from the Haroa.
 Abdur Rahim Quazi Indian politician ,MLA from the Baduria.
 ATM Abdullah Indian politician.

South 24 Parganas
Abdur Razzak Molla, Former Minister for Land and Land Reforms 
 Abul Hasnat, Bengali physician . 
 Firdousi Begum, First Lady MLA of Sonarpur Uttar

Howrah
Azangachhi Shaheb, Indian Sufi saint.
Hannan Mollah, social worker and MLA

Uttar Dinajpur
Abdul Karim Chowdhury , Bengali Former Politician , Ex Minister for Mass Education Extension and Library Services.

Midanapur
Ubaidullah Al Ubaidi Suhrawardy, Bengali Educationist. 
Khujista Akhtar Banu, writer, social reformer.
Begum Badar un nissa Akhtar, Indian social reformer.
Zahid Suhrawardy, jurist and lawyer.
Hasan Shaheed Suhrawardy, Translator, art critic, Diplomat.
Huseyn Shaheed Suhrawardy, Prime minister of Bengal.

Cooch Behar
Abbasuddin Ahmed, Folk singer and Composer.
Ferdausi Rahman, Folk singer

See also

 Islam in Bangladesh
 Bengali Muslims
 Islam in India

References 

 

West Bengal
 

id:Islam di Benggala Barat